Banksia ser. Tetragonae is a taxonomic series in the genus Banksia. It consists of three closely related species of erect shrub with pendulous inflorescences in section Banksia. These are:

References

External links

 ser. Tetragonae
Eudicots of Western Australia
Plant series